Oskar Mobil a.s. was a telecommunications company in the Czech Republic between 1999 and 2005.  The company was purchased by Vodafone in 2005 and changed its name to Vodafone Czech Republic a.s.

After an extended and intense tendering process, a third GSM dual-band 900/1800 MHz license was awarded to a consortium led by TIW (operating in the Czech Republic under the name ClearWave, N.V.) in Prague on September 29, 1999.

Five months later on March 1, 2000, Oskar went live as Cesky Mobil a.s. The company was the third GSM network in the Czech Republic. Karla Stephens was its first official employee and served as Chief Commercial Officer. In the coming years, Oskar continued to grow at pace, settling at 17% market share with 1.83M customers by 2005. Stephens was promoted to COO ("Chief Oskar Officer") in 2002. Her tenure as COO did not go unnoticed by the Czech media and telecommunications industry analysts. Oskar was the recipient of numerous awards in its six years on the Czech market, including the Rhodos Image Award - Telecom for 2003–2005, the World Communication Award (2001–2002, 2003, 2005) and the League of American Communications Professionals' Vision Award (Best Annual Report) for (2001, 2003 and 2005). Stephens herself also earned a Stevie Award (2005) for Female Entrepreneurs in EMEA.

Rumors of financial trouble at TIW forced Oskar to eventually undertake a massive corporate debt refinancing late in 2004. Fortunately for Stephens and Tolstoy, the debt refinancing was a tremendous success. There was speculation as to which telecommunications giant, Orange or Vodafone, would make their move into the Czech market. Oskar was bid on solely by Vodafone and a deal was struck on March 15, 2005 for an estimated $860M-$1.3B, a return of over 100% for the TIW investors and a giant victory for senior management.

Vodafone continues to perform well in the Czech market. In 2010, the company gained its three millionth customer and competition with T-Mobile and O2 remains as fierce as ever.

Former Executives
Karla Stephens-Tolstoy, former Oskar CEO; current Tokii CEO
Muriel Anton, former Oskar Vice President (Finance); current Vodafone Czech Republic a.s. CEO
Andre Jerome, former Oskar Vice President (Legal and Regulatory)
Mario Mele, former Oskar Vice President (Marketing)
Igor Prervosky, former Oskar Vice President (Brand)
Fran Hansen, former Oskar Vice President (Human Resources)
Ann Hofvander, former Oskar Vice President (Sales)
Andreas Laukemann, former Oskar Vice President (Planning)
Fred Hrenchuk, former Oskar Vice President (Technology)

References 

Telecommunications companies established in 1999
Telecommunications in the Czech Republic
Telecommunications companies of the Czech Republic
Czech companies established in 1999